Joe Burch (born ) is a former American football offensive and defensive lineman.

Early years
Burch prepped at David W. Carter High School in Dallas, Texas, where he won the 1988 5A Texas state championship (vacated due to ineligible player) alongside Jessie Armstead and Clifton Abraham.

College career
He went on to play at Texas Southern University, where he was named second-team All-Southwestern Athletic Conference during his sophomore and junior year. As a senior in 1993, he was named Offensive Lineman of the Year, First Team Division I-AA All-American and All-Southwestern Athletic Conference.

Professional career
He was drafted in the third round (90th overall) of the 1994 NFL Draft by the New England Patriots before being traded to the Denver Broncos. Burch began his arena football career in 1995, starting the season with Connecticut Coyotes before being traded to the  Arizona Rattlers for quarterback Aaron Garcia.

On March 21, 2002, Burch re-signed with the Rattlers.

References

External links
AFL stats

1971 births
Living people
People from Dallas
American football offensive linemen
American football defensive linemen
Texas Southern Tigers football players
Connecticut Coyotes players
Arizona Rattlers players
Houston ThunderBears players
Las Vegas Gladiators players